European Parliament elections were held in Greece on 7 June 2009 to elect the 22 Greek members of the European Parliament. Members were elected by party-list proportional representation with a 3% electoral threshold. The number of seats allocated to Greece was reduced from 24 to 22, as a result of new member states joining the European Union (EU). Consistent with EU-wide rules, Greek citizens resident in another of the 26-member states were permitted to vote in the place where they currently reside.

Participating parties
On 24 May, the Greek Court of Cassation, the country's supreme court, accepted the applications of 27 of the 33 parties which applied to contest the elections. It banned six parties from participating:
Alternative Ecologists
Party of Responsible Citizenship
Dimokratiki
Party of Uprising Pensioners of Greece
Panagriarian Workers Movement
Political Greek-European Animal-Loving Movement
Animal-Loving Ecologists of Greece

In addition, the court ruled that the following parties could not participate as part of the Coalition of the Radical Left:
Democratic Social Movement
Movement of Active Citizens
Movement for the United in Action Left
Kokkino
Xekinima
Ecosocialists of Greece
ROZA

A judicial dispute ensued, when Drassi filed a petition before the Council of State to annul the ministerial decision, through which the time for political advertising spots on the radio and television would be allocated, since it disproportionately favoured established parties. A preliminary ruling sent the dispute to the Council of State's plenary session, which will hear the petition for annulment on 25 September 2009.

Opinion polls

Results

Further reading

References

Greece
European Parliament elections in Greece
2009 in Greek politics
Europe